Hopea rudiformis is a tree in the family Dipterocarpaceae, native to Borneo. The specific epithet rudiformis means "sword-shaped", referring to the leaf.

Description
The bark is smooth and greyish.

Distribution and habitat
Hopea rudiformis is endemic to Borneo.

Conservation
Hopea rudiformis has been assessed as critically endangered on the IUCN Red List. It is threatened mainly by logging for its timber. It is also threatened by land conversion for agriculture. In Kalimantan, the species is threatened by fires. The species is found in some protected areas.

References

rudiformis
Endemic flora of Borneo
Plants described in 1978